Alberite is a village of La Rioja in Spain. The football team CCD Alberite is based in Alberite.

References

External links 
 Official website 

Municipalities in La Rioja (Spain)